Birdseye Highway is an east–west road across Eyre Peninsula in South Australia. It was named for Sylvia Birdseye who drove the first bus service to the area from Adelaide for 43 years, starting in 1928, and is the first highway in South Australia to be named for a woman.

Route
Birdseye Highway connects Elliston on Flinders Highway on the west coast, through Cleve and Lock to Cowell on the Lincoln Highway near the Spencer Gulf coast.

Major junctions

References

Highways in South Australia
Eyre Peninsula